Magnus Blakstad (born 18 January 1994) is a Norwegian footballer who plays as a midfielder for Ranheim.

He signed a contract with Ranheim in 2013 and made his debut on 14 April 2013 against Ullensaker/Kisa, a game they won 3–1.

Career statistics

Club

References

1994 births
Living people
Footballers from Trondheim
Norwegian footballers
Rosenborg BK players
Ranheim Fotball players
Eliteserien players
Norwegian First Division players

Association football midfielders